Štadión pod Dubňom is an all-seater football stadium situated in Žilina, Slovakia, which is the home of MŠK Žilina.  It is named after the hill Dubeň, adjacent to which it is located, and the name of the stadium literally means "Stadium under the Dubeň Hill."

History
The original stadium was opened on 10 August 1941 although the ground had been in use since the club's foundation in 1909. As of 2002, predominantly due to UEFA requirements, the club proposed an extensive renovation of the stadium. Throughout the first stages of redevelopment all seating low capacity stands were erected behind the goals to comply with UEFA rules. Following years, as the expansion continued, extra rows of seats were added and both stands were fully covered.

Since the 2012–13 season, the away supporters have been housed on one side of the North Stand, historically the Kop stand attended solely by the home fans.  This decision has triggered a huge discontent among the home supporters, with many of them boycotting to attend home games as a sign of protest.

Currently the stadium consists of four separate stands.  The West and East Stands run alongside the pitch, with West Stand considered to be the main stand equipped with VIP seats, hospitality boxes and press room, TV commentators seats as well as section for wheelchair users. Changing rooms are also situated in the West Stand. The East Stand was the last to be rebuilt and was reopened before 2009–10 season.

For security purposes the stadium has been equipped with modern security installations such as a monitoring system.  The intensity of the floodlighting is 1,930 lux.  There is also a large screen inside the ground for showing highlights of match days.  A prayer room is situated between South and East Stand.

The capacity is 11,253 seats with the prospect of future expansion to hold a crowd of up to 15,000 spectators.

Štadión pod Dubňom was also a venue to host international matches of the Slovakia national football team until 2016, when the natural grass was replaced by the artificial grass.

The stadium was one of the venues used for the 2013 UEFA European Under-17 Championship where six matches were held including the final.

International matches
Štadión pod Dubňom has hosted 11 competitive and 10 friendly matches of the Slovakia national football team.

References

External links
Stadium Database Article
UEFA Profile
Football stadiums profile

Football venues in Slovakia
MŠK Žilina
Buildings and structures in Žilina Region
Sports venues completed in 1941
1941 establishments in Czechoslovakia
Sport in Žilina Region